Benefit or benefits may refer to:

Arts, entertainment and media
 Benefit (album), by Jethro Tull, 1970
 "Benefits" (How I Met Your Mother), a 2009 TV episode
 The Benefit, a 2012 Egyptian action film

Businesses and organisations
 Benefit Cosmetics, an American cosmetics company
 The Benefit Company, a Bahraini interbanking company

Places
 Benefit, Georgia, US

Welfare
 Benefit (social welfare)
 Federal benefits, US
 Benefit (sports), a pre-retirement event to benefit a player
 Benefit performance, entertainment to support a cause
 Benefit concert, or charity concert
 Employee benefits
 Health benefits (insurance)

See also

 Entitlement
 Health benefits (medicine)
 Incentive
 Incentive program
 Loyalty marketing
 Loyalty program
 Reward (disambiguation)
 Value (disambiguation)